Frank Matich (25 January 193511 May 2015) was an Australian racing car driver. A highly successful motor racing competitor in the 1960s and 1970s,  Matich built his own range of Matich sports cars and open wheel cars, mainly to support his own career, but some cars found success with other drivers. In these and other makes he won five Tasman Series races, two Australian Grands Prix, the 1972 Australian Drivers' Championship and a number of other Australian motor racing titles.

In April 1970, Frank Matich was appointed as a Director of Lambretta (Australasia) Pty Ltd, and was to assemble McLaren racing cars in the Lambretta site in Artarmon, Sydney.

Matich, who suffered major electrical burns in a boating accident in 1973, retired from racing in 1974 in order to spend more time with his family and his business. His son Kris Matich became a leading Formula Ford driver in Sydney during the late 1980s.

Career results

A summary of some of his motor racing achievements is given in the table below:

Complete Tasman Series results

Australian Grand Prix

References

Further reading
 James Cockington, Can-Am's Oz Invader, Australian Motorsport News, No 395, May 2010, pages 58–62

External links
 Frank Matich at speedcafe.com

Australian racing drivers
2015 deaths
Tasman Series drivers
1935 births